Hyperacuity may refer to:
Hyperacuity (album)
Hyperacuity (scientific term)